Prince Frederick Henry Albert of Prussia (4 October 1809 – 14 October 1872) was the fifth son and youngest child of King Frederick William III of Prussia and Louise of Mecklenburg-Strelitz. His parents had fled to East Prussia after the occupation of Berlin by Napoleon, and Albert was born in Königsberg. Two of Albert's elder brothers were Frederick William IV, King of Prussia from 1840 till 1861, and William I, King of Prussia from 1861 to 1888 and German Emperor from 1871 until 1888.

Career

In 1819 he joined the Prussian Army as a lieutenant and held the rank of a general of cavalry in 1852. He took part in the 1866 Austro-Prussian War as a cavalry corps commander at the battles of Gitschin and Königgrätz. In the Franco-Prussian War of 1870/71 he led a cavalry division at the battles of Wissembourg, Wörth and Sedan. He later joined the forces of his nephew Prince Frederick Charles of Prussia and Frederick Francis II, Grand Duke of Mecklenburg-Schwerin in the campaign against the Armée de la Loire.

After the war Albert was awarded the title of a Generaloberst. He died in Berlin, where he is buried at the Charlottenburg Palace Park Mausoleum.

He was the 74th Grand Cross of the Order of the Tower and Sword.

Family
In The Hague, on 14 September 1830 Albert married Princess Marianne, daughter of King William I of the Netherlands. The marriage was dissolved on 28 March 1849. They had five children:

 Charlotte (b. Schloss Schönhausen, near Berlin, 21 June 1831 - d. Meiningen, 30 March 1855), married on 18 May 1850 with the future Georg II, Duke of Saxe-Meiningen.
 A son (Prinz-Albrecht-Palais, Wilhelmstraße, near Berlin, 4 December 1832). He was either stillborn or lived only a few hours.
 Albert (b. Berlin, 8 May 1837 - d. Kamenz, 13 September 1906), married Princess Marie of Saxe-Altenburg, had 3 sons.
  Elisabeth (b. Kamenz, 27 August 1840 - d. Kamenz, 9 October 1840).
 Alexandrine (b. Berlin, 1 February 1842 - d. Schloss Marley, near Potsdam, 26 March 1906), married on 9 December 1865 to Duke William of Mecklenburg-Schwerin.

In Berlin on 13 June 1853, Albert married secondly Rosalie Wilhelmine Johanna von Rauch, daughter of Gustav von Rauch, chief of the Prussian General Staff 1812-1813 and Prussian Minister of War 1837–1841. She was created Countess of Hohenau on 28 May 1853. They had two sons:

 Georg Albrecht Wilhelm, Count of Hohenau (b. Albrechtsberg Castle, 25 April 1854 - d. Bad Flinsburg, 28 October 1930). He married Princess Margarethe of Hohenlohe-Öhringen (1865-1940), daughter of Hugo zu Hohenlohe-Öhringen.
 Bernhard Wilhelm Albrecht Frederick, Count of Hohenau (b. Albrechtsberg Castle, 21 May 1857 - d. Ochelhermsdorf, 15 April 1914).

As this second union was considered a morganatic marriage, the couple temporarily had to avoid the Prussian court. Albert acquired a vineyard in Loschwitz near Dresden, Saxony, where he had a residence, Albrechtsberg Castle, erected in 1854.

Aftermath
In 1830 Albert had acquired a city palace in Berlin on Wilhelmstraße, then called Prinz-Albrecht-Palais. An adjacent street off Wilhelmstraße laid out in 1891 was named Prinz-Albrecht-Straße. After the Nazi Machtergreifung it became notorious as the seat of the Gestapo and the Reichsführer-SS. The Prinz-Albrecht-Palais itself from 1934 served as the headquarters of the SS Sicherheitsdienst under Reinhard Heydrich, from 1939 the Reichssicherheitshauptamt. In 1944 the building was heavily damaged by air raids and finally razed to the ground in 1955, leaving the foundations and cellars exposed to the open air. They remain so today, and are used as part of the Topography of Terror project.

Honours
German orders and decorations

Foreign orders and decorations

Ancestry

References

External links

1809 births
1872 deaths
Military personnel from Königsberg
Prussian princes
House of Hohenzollern
Nobility from Königsberg
Colonel generals of Prussia
19th-century Prussian military personnel
Burials at the Charlottenburg Palace Park Mausoleum, Berlin
Recipients of the Pour le Mérite (military class)
Grand Crosses of the Order of Saint Stephen of Hungary
Grand Croix of the Légion d'honneur
Recipients of the Order of the Netherlands Lion
Recipients of the Order of St. Anna, 1st class
Recipients of the Order of the White Eagle (Russia)
Recipients of the Order of St. George of the Third Degree
Sons of kings